The Electric Tilt Train is the name for two identical high-speed tilting trains operated by Queensland Rail on the North Coast line from Brisbane to Bundaberg and Rockhampton which entered service in November 1998.

History 
In March 1993, Queensland Rail issued a tender for the construction of two electric six-carriage tilting trains. In October 1994, a contract was awarded to Walkers, Maryborough with Hitachi to supply the electrical and tilting equipment. The Electric Tilt Train initially began tests on 12 August 1997 when it conducted its first run between Maryborough West and Gympie North Stations. This was later followed by tests from Maryborough to Roma Street on 25 October 1997 and first trial run to Rockhampton on 15 November 1997. November 1997 also saw the Train conduct the first testing involving its Tilting mechanism.

After an extensive testing, on 6 November 1998, Australia's first pair of tilting trains entered service on the Spirit of Capricorn between Brisbane and Rockhampton. With a journey time of seven hours, they shaved over two hours from the schedule operated by InterCity Express sets. In July 1999, a second daily service was introduced between Brisbane and Bundaberg.

This also makes it the fastest narrow-gauge train in the world.
 
In 2006, the electric sets underwent an $8.3 million refurbishment program at Mayne depot.

In 2015, the tilt train sets again undertook refurbishment over the course of 12 months with the addition of high visibility yellow doors, and a modification of the front ends. The traction packages were given a complete overhaul to extend the life of the tilt train. The trains also had Wi-Fi installed to enable wireless internet for passengers. The first refurbished set re-entered service in July 2016. The second refurbished set re-entered service in July 2017.

Routes 

Commencing in 1998, the Electric Tilt Train operates from Brisbane to Rockhampton. The train operates the on the North Coast line and serves the intermediate towns of Gympie, Maryborough, Bundaberg and Gladstone. The Electric Tilt Trains run in a multiple unit configuration.

The electric Tilt Train features 2×2 economy seating, and 1×2 business class seating, mainscreen visual entertainment along with in-seat audio entertainment. Economy class passengers have a regular trolley service and a buffet style galley food service, while business class has a frequent trolley service and passenger attendants to tend to the needs of the passengers.

Notes and references

External links 
Specifications
Tilt Train
Flickr gallery

Electric multiple units of Queensland
High-speed rail
Named passenger trains of Queensland
Tilting trains
1997 establishments in Australia
25 kV AC multiple units
Walkers Limited multiple units